The Attending Physician of the United States Congress is the physician responsible for the medical welfare of the members of the United States Congress (the 435 representatives, five delegates, Resident Commissioner of Puerto Rico, and 100 senators) and the nine justices of the Supreme Court of the United States. 

The Attending Physician is also tasked with emergency care for thousands of staff, security personnel and dignitaries, and implementation of the environmental health, public health, and occupational health programs of the Capitol Hill region (which includes the Capitol, the congressional office buildings, and the Supreme Court building). The Attending Physician is instrumental in security planning and works with the Architect of the Capitol, Senate Sergeant at Arms, House Sergeant at Arms, United States Capitol Police, and other congressional officials to ensure medical support during contingency operations.

History
The Office of Attending Physician (OAP) was established by congressional resolution in 1928 to meet the medical needs of Members of Congress.  The OAP began serving the medical needs of the U.S. House of Representatives in 1929 and the following year, in 1930, began serving the U.S. Senate. The first Attending Physician, Dr. George Calver, served the Congress for approximately 37 years.  The current attending physician of the United States Congress is Dr. Brian Monahan. He holds the rank of rear admiral in the United States Navy. Dr. Monahan was appointed to the position by President Barack Obama in January 2009.

The Office of the Attending Physician under the leadership of Dr. John Francis Eisold played a central role in the response to the 2001 anthrax attacks on Senator Tom Daschle's Senate office, taking nasal swabs from the nearly 6,000 staff, employees, and visitors that were potentially exposed to the harmful bacteria. Former Attending Physician Rear Admiral Dr. John Eisold and his staff also provided initial treatment to Senator Tim Johnson when he suffered from an intracerebral bleed caused by a cerebral arteriovenous malformation, prior to Johnson's admission to George Washington University Hospital.

Routine care 
OAP provides members of Congress with physicals and routine examinations, on-site X-rays and lab work, physical therapy and referrals to medical specialists from military hospitals and private medical practices. When specialists are needed, they are brought to the Capitol, often at no charge to members of Congress.

Members of Congress do not pay for the individual services they receive at the OAP, nor do they submit claims through their federal employee health insurance policies. Instead, as of 2009, members pay a flat, annual fee of $503 for all the care they receive. The rest of the cost of their care is paid for by federal funding, from the U.S. Navy budget.  The annual fee has not changed significantly since 1992.

List of attending physicians

Sources
United States Senate Historical Minute Essay: A Doctor's Warning, February 3, 1951
United States House of Representatives Weekly Historical Highlights: October 11, 1966

References

Employees of the United States Congress
 United States Congress